The following gallery displays the official coats of arms of the 27 oblasts, autonomous republics and cities with special status of Ukraine:

State

Regional

Historical

Coats of Arms of Kingdom of Galicia–Volhynia of Kievan Rus

Coats of Arms of Voivodeships of Polish-Lithuanian Commonwealth

Cossack Hetmanate

Coats of Arms of Governorates of Russian Empire in Ukraine

Coats of Arms of Crownlands of Austrian Empire in Ukraine

Oblasts

Cherkasy Oblast

Chernihiv Oblast

Chernivtsi Oblast

Dnipropetrovsk Oblast

Donetsk Oblast

Ivano-Frankivsk Oblast

Kharkiv Oblast

Kherson Oblast

Khmelnytskyi Oblast

Kyiv Oblast

Kirovohrad Oblast

Luhansk Oblast

Lviv Oblast

Mykolaiv Oblast

Odesa Oblast

Poltava Oblast

Rivne Oblast

Sumy Oblast

Ternopil Oblast

Vinnytsia Oblast

Volyn Oblast

Zakarpattia Oblast

Zaporizhzhia Oblast

Zhytomyr Oblast

See also
Armorial of Little Russia
Coat of arms of Ukraine
Flags of the regions of Ukraine

National symbols of Ukraine
 
Ukraine